The Moredun Research Institute is a scientific research institution based at the Pentlands Science Park, in the Bush Estate area of Midlothian, Scotland. It conducts research into diseases of farm livestock and the promotion of animal health and welfare.

Moredun employs over 200 vets, scientists and support staff, that are funded primarily by the Agriculture, Food and Rural Communities Directorate of the Scottish Government. The Institute received £7.1 million from the government in 2010–11.

History
The Animal Diseases Research Association, now the registered charity the Moredun Foundation, was founded in 1920 by a group of Scottish farmers, with the aim of improving the health of livestock, especially sheep. The association founded a research institute employing vets and scientists, and over the decades the scope of animal health work expanded to cover goats, cows, horses and wildlife.

The Institute was originally based at Moredun, in Edinburgh.

The origins of Moredun go back to the years following World War I which saw an increased demand for home grown food and a significant rise in the market value of livestock. This emphasised the seriousness of the losses associated with disease and concerned farmers voiced their strong support for an organised body to conduct research into livestock diseases. In the 1920s Louping Ill and Braxy claimed almost a third of the lambs born in Scotland and Grass Sickness was having a devastating effect on horses, which were used for heavy labour on farms at that time. In March 1920 a group of enlightened Scottish farmers held a public meeting at the Highland and Agricultural Society's chambers in Edinburgh and the Animal Diseases Research Association (now known as The Moredun Foundation) was formed. Within six years the founder members had raised enough funds to buy a plot of land and build the Moredun Research Institute. Within ten years of the Research Institute opening, Moredun scientists had discovered the cause and developed vaccines and treatment strategies for Braxy and lamb dysentery. Scientists then went on to solve the mystery of Louping Ill which was found to be caused by a virus transmitted by ticks and a vaccine was soon developed.

By the 1940s over half a million doses of vaccine and treatment products were produced and distributed by Moredun. Research gained momentum and further funding was secured to find out the causes of many different diseases such as: scrapie, pine, milk fever, Johne’s disease and a range of respiratory and reproductive disorders. Vaccines, diagnostics and treatment strategies followed. Today, many of the veterinary medicines and vaccines that are routinely used on farms have been researched, developed or tested at Moredun. This research is vital – 17% of the value of the UK sheep industry is lost each year due to infectious diseases. Subclinical infections of gut parasites are estimated to cost the UK sheep industry over £84 million a year in lost production. Enzootic abortion in ewes is thought to cost the UK sheep industry £15 million a year and Johne’s disease costs the UK cattle industry £13 million a year. Ninety years on, and still governed by farmers, Moredun’s mission to improve animal health and welfare remains strong and Moredun continues to apply cutting edge science and technology to help protect both livestock and people, today and tomorrow.

Pentlands Science Park
The Pentlands Science Park opened in 1995. It is part of the Moredun Group, under the control of the Moredun Foundation. It is a public-private partnership. The Pentlands Science Park and Moredun are participants in the Edinburgh Science Triangle project.

In addition to being the home of the Moredun Research Institute, the science park has attracted 20 companies to the site. The focus of Pentlands Science Park is animal bioscience but the tenants include research companies involved in pharmaceuticals, software, and environmental science. The area occupied by non-Moredun organisations is approximately 55,000 sq ft, and these tenants employ over 200 people.

Senior staff
 Prof Julie Fitzpatrick, Chief Executive of the Moredun Group and Scientific Director of the Moredun Research Institute
 Mr Colin Burnett, Group Finance Director
 Dr Colin McInnes, Deputy Director
 Dr Alasdair Nisbet, Head of Vaccines
 Dr David Longbottom, Head of Diagnostics
 Dr Tom McNeilly, Head of Disease Control
 Fiona Vandepeear, Head of Business Administration
 Prof Lee Innes, Head of Communications
 Jill Hodgson, Head of Human Resources
 George Walker, Park Manager of Pentlands Science Park Ltd
 Mr John Murray, managing director of Moredun Scientific

See also
 Animal health
 Animal science
 GALVmed
 Livestock husbandry
 Louping ill
 Scottish Agricultural Revolution
 Veterinary medicine
 Veterinary pathology

People associated with the Institute
 Prof John Russell Greig FRSE, Director of the Institute 1930 to 1954
 Thomas J Mackie
 John Scott, 9th Duke of Buccleuch
 Alexander Trees, Baron Trees

The Bush Estate
 Roslin Institute
 Royal (Dick) School of Veterinary Studies of the University of Edinburgh
 Scottish Agricultural College (SAC)

Other Scottish research institutes
 Aberdeen Research Consortium
 Easter Howgate
 Fisheries Research Services Marine Laboratory
 Forestry Commission Scotland
 Inverness Campus
 James Hutton Institute
 Macaulay Institute
 Rowett Research Institute
 Scottish Agricultural Science Agency
 Scottish Crop Research Institute

References

External links
 Official website

1920 establishments in Scotland
Agricultural research institutes in the United Kingdom
Agriculture in Scotland
Agronomy
Animal disease control
Animal health in Scotland
Animal husbandry
Buildings and structures in Midlothian
Organisations based in Midlothian
Organisations supported by the Scottish Government
Research institutes established in 1920
Research institutes in Scotland
Sheep and goat diseases
Veterinary research institutes
Zoology organizations
Veterinary medicine in Scotland